Ashby Columbus Dunbar (October 15, 1879 – May 5, 1925) was a Negro leagues Outfielder for several years before the founding of the first Negro National League. Dunbar played with many teams, and appears to have spent the most seasons with the Brooklyn Royal Giants.

After his first few seasons with Brooklyn, Dunbar moved to the Lincoln Giants for one season. He bounced from the Paterson Smart Set, and the Mohawk Giants, to the Louisville White Sox, then Chicago Black Sox.

He was picked up for the Winter season by the Indianapolis ABCs by first playing for their Royal Poinciana Hotel team, and stayed to play a regular summer season with the ABCs.

Dunbar moved back out east, and back with the Lincoln Stars in 1916. His last known game is for the Pennsylvania Red Caps.

References

External links

1879 births
1925 deaths
Negro league baseball managers
Brooklyn Royal Giants players
Indianapolis ABCs players
Pennsylvania Red Caps of New York players
Lincoln Giants players
Louisville White Sox (1914-1915) players
Philadelphia Giants players
Schenectady Mohawk Giants players
Baseball players from Virginia
Sportspeople from Charlottesville, Virginia
20th-century African-American people